The Thomas Kirby House in Kendrick, Idaho was built in 1889 and modified in 1910 and otherwise.  It was built for Thomas Kirby, a man highly responsible for the railroads that started in Kendrick and went to Troy, Idaho.

The house is eclectic Queen Anne in style, with elements of Stick and Eastlake architecture.  The 1998 NRHP nomination stated it "still commands attention and is significant as one of the best remaining examples of Victorian residential architecture in Idaho's North-Central region."

It was listed on the National Register of Historic Places in 1999.

See also
 National Register of Historic Places listings in Latah County, Idaho

References

Houses on the National Register of Historic Places in Idaho
Queen Anne architecture in Idaho
Houses completed in 1889
Houses in Latah County, Idaho
National Register of Historic Places in Latah County, Idaho